Ráztely (until 1910 Rastely, until 1950 Raztely) is a village and administrative part of Mirovice in Písek District in the South Bohemian Region of the Czech Republic.

History
The first record of Rastely is from 1068. Another record can be found in the Codex Vyssegradensis from about 1085. Until 1323 the village was, together with Svučice and another 20 villages along the old salt path from Passau, the property of the Vyšehrad Chapter. Rastely later became a manor estate where on its fortified house lived Jiřík z Rastel in 1511 (he died in 1542). His daughter Anna sold the village to Jan and Jiřík of Ploskovice. Rastely was accredited to Kryštof Loubský z Lub na Rencích during the Czech assembly of 1584. After Rastely became the property of the House of Šic of Drahenice it was pillaged in 1622 and in 1623 sold to Příbík Jeníšek z Újezda when it was also merged with the nearby town Březnice. Eight houses were part of the former Drahenice manor. Ráztely belongs to the parish of Drahenice.

Sights

Chapel of John of Nepomuk

References

Populated places in Písek District
Neighbourhoods in the Czech Republic